Célia Allamargot also known as Célia Pashley (born 14 April 1986) is a former professional French female squash player.

Squash career
She competed in the Women's World Team Squash Championships in 2004, 2006 and 2008. Célia Allamargot achieved her highest singles career ranking of 61 in June 2009.

References 

1986 births
Living people
French female squash players
Sportspeople from La Rochelle
21st-century French women